Tupuzabad (also Romanized as Tūpūzābād; also known as Topūzābād) is a village in Baranduzchay-ye Jonubi Rural District, in the Central District of Urmia County, West Azerbaijan Province, Iran. At the 2006 census, its population was 171, in 43 families.

References 

Populated places in Urmia County